Wied is an Ortsgemeinde – a community belonging to a Verbandsgemeinde – in the Westerwaldkreis in Rhineland-Palatinate, Germany.

Geography

The community lies in the Westerwald between Limburg and Siegen in the Wied valley. Through the community flows the Wied. Wied belongs to the Verbandsgemeinde of Hachenburg, a kind of collective municipality. Its seat is in the like-named town.

History
In 1461, Wied had its first documentary mention. Originally, Wied was called Wiede, which meant something like “grazing land” (Weide in modern German).

Politics

The municipal council is made up of 13 council members, including the honorary mayor (Bürgermeister), who were elected in a majority vote in a municipal election on 13 June 2004.

Economy and infrastructure

The community lies right on Bundesstraße 413, leading from Bendorf (near Koblenz) to Hachenburg. The nearest Autobahn interchanges are in Dierdorf and Neuwied on the A 3 (Cologne–Frankfurt), some 20 km away. The nearest InterCityExpress stop is the railway station at Montabaur on the Cologne-Frankfurt high-speed rail line.

References

External links
Wied 
Wied in the collective municipality’s Web pages 

Municipalities in Rhineland-Palatinate
Westerwaldkreis